Negotiable Instruments Act, 1881 is an act in India dating from the British colonial rule, that is still in force largely unchanged.

History 
The history of the present Act is a long one. The Act was originally drafted in 1866 by the 3rd Indian Law Commission and introduced in December 1867 in the Council and it was referred to a Select Committee. Objections were raised by the mercantile community to the numerous deviations from the English  Law in which it contained. The Bill had to be redrafted in 1877. After the lapse of a sufficient period for criticism by the Local Governments, the High Courts and the chambers of commerce, the Bill was revised by a Select Committee. In spite of this Bill could not reach the final stage. In 1880 by the Order of the Secretary of State, the Bill had to be referred to a new Law Commission. On the recommendation of the new Law Commission, the Bill was re-drafted and again it was sent to a Select Committee which adopted most of the additions recommended by the new Law Commission. The draft thus prepared for the fourth time was introduced in the Council and was passed into law in 1881 being the Negotiable Instruments Act, 1881 (Act No.26 of 1881)

The most important class of Credit Instruments that evolved in India were termed Hundi. Their use was most widespread in the twelfth century and has continued till today. In a sense, they represent the oldest surviving form of credit instrument. These were used in trade and credit transactions; they were used as remittance instruments for the purpose of transfer of funds from one place to another. In Modern era Hundi served as traveller's cheques.

According to Section 13 of the Negotiable Instruments Act, "A negotiable instrument means a promissory note, bill of exchange or cheque payable either to order or to bearer.' But in Section 1, it is also described that Local extent, Saving of usage relating to hundis, etc., Commencement. -It extends to the whole of India but nothing herein contained affects the Indian Paper Currency Act, 1871, Section 21, or affects any local usage relating to any instrument in an oriental language. Provided that such usages may be excluded by any words in the body of the instrument, which indicate an intention that the legal relations of the parties thereto shall be governed by this Act; and it shall come

Main Types of Negotiable Instruments are:

 Inland Instruments
 Foreign Instruments
 Bank 
Finance companies(listed) Draft

Modern day
We prefer to carry a small piece of paper known as Cheque rather than carrying the currency worth the value of the Cheque. Before 1988 there being no provision to restrain the person issuing the Cheque without having sufficient funds in his account. Of course on Dishonoured cheque there is a civil liability accrued. In order to ensure promptitude and remedy against the defaulters of the Negotiable Instrument a criminal remedy of penalty was inserted in Negotiable Instruments Act, 1881 by amending it with Negotiable Instruments Act, 1988.

With the insertion of these provisions in the Act the situation certainly improved and the instances of dishonour have relatively come down but on account of application of different interpretative techniques by different High Courts on different provisions of the Act it further compounded and complicated the situation although on dishonour of cheques the trends of the verdicts of the Supreme Court of India

Parliament enacted the Negotiable Instruments (Amendment and Miscellaneous Provisions) Act, 2002 (55 of 2002), which is intended to plug the loopholes. This amendment Act inserts five new sections from 143 to 147 touching various limbs of the parent Act and Cheque truncation through digitally were also included and the amendment Act was into force on February 6, 2003.

Review and Reform 
In June 2020, the Finance Ministry in the Government of India proposed the decriminalisation of a number of white-collar crimes, including cheque bouncing under Section 138 of the Negotiable Instruments Act, in order to improve the ease of doing business as well as to reduce imprisonment rates. The proposal has been opposed by a number of trade and business associations, including the Confederation of All-India Traders (CAIT), the Indian Banks' Association and Finance Industry Development Council (FIDC), and the Federation of Industrial and Commercial Organisation (FICO).

References

External links 
N.I.A (Mobile Friendly)

Law of India
Law of Pakistan
1881 in law
Negotiable instrument law
Legislation in British India
1881 in British law
1881 in India